El-Mansoura Sporting Club, is an Egyptian football club based in El Mansoura, Egypt. The club is currently playing in the Egyptian Second Division, the second-highest league in the Egyptian football league system.

The club was founded in 1932 as El Nady El Malaky Sporting Club, and the membership was limited to the Civil servants only from the "Six Degree". The club's headquarters was the Mansoura Faculty of Medicine now, this lasted until the club moved to its current headquarters in 1949, the club name was also changed to El Baladeya Sporting Club in the same year; however, in 1971 the club name was changed again to its current name.

Kits

Current squad

Performance in CAF competitions
FR = First round
SR = Second round
QF = Quarter-final
SF = Semi-final

See also
Egyptian Soccer League
Egyptian Soccer Cup
Egyptian Super Cup

References

External links
  Official Fans Website

Egyptian Second Division
Football clubs in Egypt
Association football clubs established in 1932
1932 establishments in Egypt
Sports clubs in Egypt